Asperula abbreviata is a species of flowering plant in the family Rubiaceae, known as Woodruff, and is endemic to Naxos and Amorgos in Greece. It was first formally described in 1901 by Eugen von Halácsy who gave it the name Asperula lutea var. abbreviata in Conspectus Florae Graecae. In 1943, Karl Heinz Rechinger raised the variety to species status as Asperula abbreviata in Denkschriften der Kaiserlichen Akademie der Wissenschaften / Mathematisch-Naturwissenschaftliche Classe.

Description
Asperula abbreviata appears as a small green moss-like plant, with small (1in) pale pink flowers, on relatively long stems, it has a compact cushion of small, green, needle-like, leaves.

Growth cycle
Asperula abbreviata flowers around May-June, and grows best in a rock garden, trough or crevice.

References

Plants described in 1901
abbreviata
Flora of Greece